Charles A. Bigelow (born July 29, 1945, in Detroit, Michigan) is an American type historian, professor, and designer. Bigelow grew up in the Detroit suburbs and attended the Cranbrook School in Bloomfield Hills. He received a MacArthur Fellowship in 1982, the Frederic W. Goudy Award in 1987, Sloan Science and Film screenwriting awards in 2001 and 2002, and other honors. Along with Kris Holmes, he is the co-creator of Lucida and Wingdings font families. He is a principal of the Bigelow and Holmes studio.

Bigelow received a BA in anthropology in Reed College and was a professor of digital typography at Stanford University from 1982 to 1995. As president of the Committee on Letterform Research and Education of ATypI, he organized the first international seminar on digital type design: "The Computer and the Hand in Type Design", at Stanford in 1983. 

In mid-2006, Bigelow was appointed to the Melbert B. Cary Distinguished Professorship at Rochester Institute of Technology. At RIT, he co-organized the 2010 international symposium on "The Future of Reading" and the 2012 "Reading Digital" symposium, in which type designers, publication designers, and vision scientists discussed the present and future of reading on digital devices. He retired from teaching at RIT in 2012, and is currently Cary Scholar in Residence at the Cary Graphic Arts Collection of the RIT Wallace Center.

Designed fonts
Leviathan
Syntax Phonetic
Lucida
Lucida Grande
Apple Chicago TrueType
Apple Geneva TrueType
 Apple Monaco TrueType
 Apple New York TrueType
Wingdings
Go

Publications
The design of a Unicode font
Notes on Apple 4 Fonts
Notes on typeface protection, TUGboat 7:3, 1986
Oh, oh, zero, TUGboat 34:2, 2013
A letter on the persistence of ebooks, TUGboat 35:3, 2014
About the DK versions of Lucida, TUGboat 36:3, 2015

References

Macmillan, Neil. An A–Z of Type Designers. Yale University Press: 2006. .

External links
Font Designer – Charles Bigelow (Linotype)
Identifont: Charles Bigelow
List of Charles Bigelow publications
Interview with Charles Bigelow (by Yue Wang)

1945 births
Living people
American graphic designers
American typographers and type designers
MacArthur Fellows
Artists from Detroit
Rochester Institute of Technology faculty
Reed College alumni